Bannio Anzino (pop. 539) is a commune of the Province of Verbano-Cusio-Ossola in the Italian region Piedmont, located about  northeast of Turin and about  west of Verbania.

The main population centres within the municipality are the frazioni Bannio (site of the town hall), Pontegrande and Anzino (formerly a commune in its own right); further localities include Case Fornari, Case Prucci, Case Rovazzi, Castelletto, Fontane, Gaggieto, Parcineto, Scalaccia, and Valpiana.

Bannio Anzino borders the following municipalities: Calasca-Castiglione, Carcoforo, Ceppo Morelli, Fobello, Rimella, Vanzone con San Carlo.

References

External links
 Official website

Cities and towns in Piedmont